Gnorimoschema steueri is a moth in the family Gelechiidae. It was described by Povolný in 1975. It is found in France, Germany, Austria, Italy, the Czech Republic, Slovakia and Transbaikal. The habitat consists of rocky limestone steppes on edges of thermophilous oak forests.

The length of the forewings is 4.8-5.5 mm for females and 5.8–7 mm for males. The forewings are brownish grey.

The larvae feed on Aster amellus. They mine the leaves of their host plant. The mine has the form of a whitish mine in the ground leaves of the host. They hide in a tubelet of about 10–20 mm long, made from silk and small soil grains. Full-grown larvae have a pale honey-yellow body and an amber yellow head. Pupation takes place in a cocoon, made just below the soil surface and covered by sand grains.

References

Gnorimoschema
Moths described in 1975